Neny Bay is a small indentation in the west coast of Graham Land which is bounded on the west by Neny Island, and on the northwest and southeast respectively by Stonington Island and Roman Four Promontory. The bay was first charted by the British Graham Land Expedition (BGLE) under Rymill, 1934–37. The name, derived from Neny Island, was suggested by members of East Base of the United States Antarctic Service (USAS), 1939–41, who referred to it as Neny Island Bay.

References

Bays of Graham Land
Fallières Coast